The 22nd General Assembly of Nova Scotia represented Nova Scotia between 1859 and 1863.

The assembly sat at the pleasure of the Governor of Nova Scotia, George Augustus Constantine Phipps.

Stewart Campbell was chosen as speaker for the house.

The 22nd General Assembly was actually the 21st assembly of the province, and earned its name due to an error.  According to the 1983 revised edition of The Legislative Assembly of Nova Scotia 1758 -1983 : a biographical directory:

List of Members 

Notes:

References 
Journal and proceedings of the House of Assembly of the province of Nova Scotia, Session 1860 (1860)

Terms of the General Assembly of Nova Scotia
1859 in Canada
1860 in Canada
1861 in Canada
1862 in Canada
1863 in Canada
1859 establishments in Nova Scotia
1863 disestablishments in Nova Scotia